Gamla Uppsala museum is a historical museum in Gamla Uppsala, in the northern part of Uppsala, Sweden. 

The museum is oriented towards the Vendel  and Viking era history of Gamla Uppsala. Gamla Uppsala was a major religious and cultural centre in Sweden during these eras as well as medieval Sweden between approximately the 5th and the 13th centuries, housing the famous pagan Temple at Uppsala and several large burial mounds. The museum building was designed by architect Carl Nyrén (1917– 2011). The museum opened in 2000 and is run by the Swedish National Heritage Board (Swedish:Riksantikvarieämbetet).

Gallery

See also 
List of runestones

References

External links 
 Official website (In Swedish)
 English website

History museums in Sweden
Archaeological museums in Sweden
Viking Age museums
Museums in Uppsala